Joyfull (also, Joyful) is a former settlement in Kern County, California.

Joyfull was founded by Isaac Rumford in 1884 as a Utopian colony under the auspices of the Association of Brotherly Cooperation. The Joyful post office operated from 1883 to 1884, when the colony was abandoned.

References

Former settlements in Kern County, California
Former populated places in California
Populated places established in 1881
1881 establishments in California
1884 disestablishments in the United States
Utopian communities in California